Daniel Reiche (born 14 March 1988) is a German footballer who plays as a centre-back for FSV Schöningen.

Career
Reiche was born in Braunschweig. He made his Bundesliga debut for VfL Wolfsburg on 13 September 2008 in a game against Hertha BSC. He was substituted on for Christian Gentner in the 70th minute.

Honours
 Bundesliga: 2008–09

References

External links
 

1988 births
Living people
Sportspeople from Braunschweig
German footballers
VfL Wolfsburg II players
VfL Wolfsburg players
MSV Duisburg players
SV Babelsberg 03 players
FC Viktoria Köln players
Association football defenders
Bundesliga players
2. Bundesliga players
3. Liga players
Regionalliga players
Footballers from Lower Saxony